The 2019 FC Kaisar season is the club's third season back in the Kazakhstan Premier League, the highest tier of association football in Kazakhstan, and 22nd in total. Kaisar will also participate in the Kazakhstan Cup.

Squad

Transfers

In

Out

Released

Competitions

Premier League

Results summary

Results by round

Results

League table

Kazakhstan Cup

Final

Squad statistics

Appearances and goals

|-
|colspan="14"|Players away from Kaisar on loan:
|-
|colspan="14"|Players who left Kaisar during the season:

|}

Goal scorers

Disciplinary record

References

External links
Official Website

FC Kaisar seasons
Kaisar